The Gailach is a river of Bavaria, Germany. It flows into the Altmühl near Mörnsheim.

See also
List of rivers of Bavaria

References

Rivers of Bavaria
Eichstätt (district)
Rivers of Germany